Stemmatophora combustalis is a species of snout moth. It is found in France, Spain, Portugal, Italy, Croatia, Romania, Bulgaria, North Macedonia, Albania and Greece.

The wingspan is about 18 mm.

References

Moths described in 1842
Pyralini
Moths of Europe
Taxa named by Josef Emanuel Fischer von Röslerstamm